The 1981 World 600, the 22nd running of the event, was a NASCAR Winston Cup Series race held on May 24, 1981 at Charlotte Motor Speedway in Charlotte, North Carolina. Contested over 400 laps on the 1.5 mile (2.4 km) speedway, it was the 13th race of the 1981 NASCAR Winston Cup Series season. Bobby Allison of Ranier-Lundy won the race.

Background
Charlotte Motor Speedway is a motorsports complex located in Concord, North Carolina, United States 13 miles from Charlotte, North Carolina. The complex features a 1.5 miles (2.4 km) quad oval track that hosts NASCAR racing including the prestigious World 600 on Memorial Day weekend and the National 500. The speedway was built in 1959 by Bruton Smith and is considered the home track for NASCAR with many race teams located in the Charlotte area. The track is owned and operated by Speedway Motorsports Inc. (SMI).

Race report
This race was the last Winston Cup start for 1970 Rookie of the Year Bill Dennis. Kyle Petty would get his first career top five finish. 

Donnie Allison's career was effectively ended after he sustained a serious head injury when his car hit the wall on lap 146. 
Polesitter Neil Bonnett was the early leader but crashed trying to keep Cale Yarborough a lap down midway through the race. They were racing back to the flag when Bonnett hit a slower car on lap 210.

After Bonnett retired, Bobby Allison had the dominant car, winning by a comfortable margin over 2nd-place Harry Gant.

Top ten results

Race statistics
 Time of race: 4:38:22
 Average Speed: 
 Pole Speed: 
 Cautions: 7 for 50 laps
 Margin of Victory: 8.2 seconds
 Lead changes: 32
 Percent of race run under caution: 12.5%         
 Average green flag run: 43.8 laps

References

World 600
World 600
NASCAR races at Charlotte Motor Speedway